José Tomás Ovalle y Bezanilla (December 21, 1787 – March 21, 1831) was a Chilean political figure. He served twice as provisional president of Chile.

Early life
He was born in Santiago, the son of Vicente María Ovalle Guzmán and of María del Rosario Bezanilla y Noriega. He studied in the Convictorio Carolino and law at the Universidad de San Felipe, where he obtained his doctorate in both laws in 1809. He married his cousin, Rafaela Bezanilla Bezanilla on April 1, 1812, and had eleven children.

Ovalle was twice elected deputy for Santiago (1823 and 1824–1825), supplementary senador (1824), Vice presidente of the Provincial Assembly of Santiago and was a delegate to the Plenipotenciaries Congress of 1830, being elected vice president.

Civil War of 1829
When the Chilean Civil War of 1829 broke out between the conservative centralists and the liberal federalists, President Francisco Antonio Pinto was forced twice to leave the post of president to Francisco Ramón Vicuña Larraín. First, from July 14 to October 19, when Vicuña assumed power as President Delegate, and then finally when he resigned on November 2 and Vicuña assumed full power.

On December 7, 1829 the conservative troops under General José Joaquín Prieto Vial, commander of the southern army, approached Santiago from the South. The conservative army decided to halt the march onto Santiago for a while and camped a few miles outside the city. The government under Vicuña fled northward to Coquimbo. On December 14, 1829 General Prieto and his troops met the liberal army under Francisco de la Lastra and defeated them at the Battle of Ochagavía. Then, the two military leaders signed a peace treaty, which complicated the political situation further. Meanwhile, President Vicuña and his ministers were imprisoned by the victorious conservative troops in Valparaiso.

First administration
Chile was without a leader for a few weeks (from December 7 to 24, 1829) until a Government Junta was organized and took control, in order to avoid the continuance of hostilities, under a neutral  José Tomás Ovalle who was acceptable to both sides.  This junta ruled the country from December 24, 1829 to February 18, 1830. Finally an agreement was found with the involvement of Ramón Freire which nominated Francisco Ruiz-Tagle Portales as acting president.

Second administration
Because of internal dissent with his ministers, Ruiz-Tagle Portales resigned six weeks later on March 31, 1830 and was succeeded by vice president Ovalle who assumed as a transitional president, and held the position until the advanced state of his tuberculosis forced him to ask for a constitutional leave on March 8, 1831. He died a few days later, on March 21, 1831, at 9 AM, and his remains were interred under the altar of the Santiago Cathedral, where they were lost during the renovations of the 19th century and found again in 2004.

Errázuriz Aldunate called new elections, where General José Joaquín Prieto Vial was elected. General Prieto was installed on September 18, 1831, and thus began the era of the decade governments.

Cabinet

Trivia
On 2004, his remains were found during restoration work on the Santiago Cathedral, where they had been buried (and subsequently forgotten) in 1831.

External links
 Genealogical chart of Ovalle family 

1787 births
1831 deaths
People from Santiago
Chilean people of Spanish descent
Presidents of Chile
Heads of state of Chile
Vice presidents of Chile
Members of the Senate of Chile
Members of the Chamber of Deputies of Chile
People of the Chilean Civil War of 1829–30